Mira Nair (born 15 October 1957) is an Indian-American filmmaker based in New York City. Her production company, Mirabai Films, specializes in films for international audiences on Indian society, whether in the economic, social or cultural spheres. Among her best known films are Mississippi Masala, The Namesake, the Golden Lion–winning Monsoon Wedding, and Salaam Bombay!, which received nominations for the Academy Award for Best Foreign Language Film and the BAFTA Award for Best Film Not in the English Language.

Early life and education
Mira Nair was born on 15 October 1957 in Rourkela, Orissa, India, and grew up with her two older brothers and parents in Bhubaneswar. Her father, Amrit Lal Nair, was an officer of the Indian Administrative Service and her mother, Parveen Nayyar, is a social worker who often focused on children.

She lived in Bhubaneswar until age 18, and attended a convent, following which she left to attend Loreto Convent, Tara Hall, Shimla, an Irish-Catholic missionary school, where she developed an infatuation with English literature. Following Tara Hall, Nair went on to study at Miranda House at Delhi University, where she majored in sociology. In order to gain the best education available, Nair applied for transfer to Western schools and, at 19, she was offered a full scholarship to Cambridge University, but ultimately turned it down and instead accepted a full scholarship to Harvard University.

Career
Before she became a filmmaker, Nair was originally interested in acting, and at one point she performed plays written by Badal Sarkar, a Bengali performer. While she studied at Harvard University, Nair became involved in the theater program and won a Boylston Prize for her performance of Jocasta's speech from Seneca's Oedipus.

Nair commented on film-making in a 2004 interview with FF2 Media's Jan Huttner:It’s all in how I do it. Keeping the buns on the seats is very important to me. It requires that ineffable thing called rhythm and balance in movie-making. Foils have to be created, counter-weights. From the intimacy, let’s say, of a love scene to the visceral, jugular quality of war. That shift is something in the editing, how one cuts from the intimate to the epic that keeps you there waiting. The energy propels you.Nair said to Image Journal in 2017 that she chose directing over any other art form because it was collaborative. "That’s why I am neither a photographer nor writer," she said. "I like to work with people, and my strength, if any, is that. Working with life."

Documentaries
At the start of her film-making career, Nair primarily made documentaries in which she explored Indian cultural tradition. For her film thesis at Harvard between 1978 and 1979, Nair produced a black-and-white film titled Jama Masjid Street Journal. In the eighteen-minute film, Nair explored the streets of Old Delhi and had casual conversations with Indian locals.

In 1982, she made her second documentary titled So Far from India, which is a fifty-two-minute film that followed an Indian newspaper dealer living in the subways of New York, while his pregnant wife waited for him to return home. This film was recognized as a Best Documentary winner at the American Film Festival and New York's Global Village Film Festival.

Her third documentary, India Cabaret, released in 1984, revealed the exploitation of female strippers in Bombay, and followed a customer who regularly visited a local strip club while his wife stayed at home. Nair raised roughly $130,000 for the project. The 59-minute film was shot over a span of two months. It was criticized by Nair's family. Her fourth and last documentary, made for Canadian television, explored how amniocentesis was being used to determine the sex of fetuses. Released in 1987, Children of a Desired Sex exposed the aborting of female fetuses due to society's favoring male offspring.

In 2001, with The Laughing Club of India, she explored laughter based on yoga. Founder Dr. Madan Kararia spoke of the club's history and the growth of laughing clubs across the country, and subsequently the world. The documentary included testimonials from members of the laughter clubs who described how the practice had improved or changed their lives. Its featured segments included a group of workers in an electrical products factory in Mumbai who took time off to laugh during their coffee break.

Feature films
In 1983 with her friend, Sooni Taraporevala, Nair co-wrote Salaam Bombay!. Using her documentary film-making and acting experience, Nair sought out real "street children" to more authentically portray the lives of children who survived in the streets and were deprived of a true childhood. Though the film did not do well at the box office, it won 23 international awards, including the Camera D’or and Prix du Public at the Cannes Film Festival in 1988. Salaam Bombay! was nominated at the Academy Awards for Best Foreign Language Film in 1989.

Nair and Taraporevala continued to challenge audiences with the 1991 film Mississippi Masala, which told the story of Ugandan-born Indians displaced in Mississippi. The film, featuring Denzel Washington, Roshan Seth, and Sarita Choudhury, centers on a carpet-cleaner business owner (Washington) who falls in love with the daughter (Choudhury) of one of his Indian clients. The film revealed the evident prejudice in African-American and Indian communities. Like Salaam Bombay!, the film was well received by critics, earned a standing ovation at the Sundance Film Festival in 1992, and won three awards at the Venice Film Festival.

Nair went on to direct four more films before she produced one of her most notable films, Monsoon Wedding. Released in 2001, the film told the story of a Punjabi Indian wedding, written by Sabrina Dhawan. Employing a small crew and casting some of Nair's acquaintances and relatives, the film grossed over $30 million worldwide. The film was awarded the Golden Lion award at the Venice Film Festival, making Nair the first female recipient of the award.

Nair then directed the Golden Globe winning Hysterical Blindness (2002), followed by making William Makepeace Thackeray's epic Vanity Fair (2004).

In 2007, Nair was asked to direct Harry Potter and the Order of the Phoenix, but turned it down to work on The Namesake. Based on the book by Pulitzer Prize-winner Jhumpa Lahiri, Sooni Taraporevala's screenplay follows the son of Indian immigrants who wants to fit in with New York City society, but struggles to get away from his family's traditional ways. The film was presented with the Dartmouth Film Award and was also honored with the Pride of India award at the Bollywood Movie Awards. This was followed by the Amelia Earhart biopic Amelia (2009), starring Hilary Swank and Richard Gere.

In 2012, Nair directed The Reluctant Fundamentalist, a thriller based on the best-selling novel by Mohsin Hamid. It opened the 2012 Venice Film Festival to critical acclaim and was released worldwide in early 2013. For the academic reception of Nair's adaptation of The Reluctant Fundamentalist, The Journal of Commonwealth Literature questions "how the ambivalence and provocativeness of the 'source' text translates into the film adaptation, and the extent to which the film format makes the narrative more palatable and appealing to wider audiences as compared to the novel’s target readership."

Nair's 2016 film Queen of Katwe, a Walt Disney Pictures production, starred Lupita Nyong'o and David Oyelowo and was based on the story of Ugandan chess prodigy Phiona Mutesi.

Nair's short films include A Fork, a Spoon and a Knight, inspired by the Nelson Mandela quote, ″Difficulties break some men but make others.″ She contributed to 11'09"01 September 11 (2002) in which 11 filmmakers reacted to the events of 11 September 2001. Other titles include How Can It Be? (2008), Migration (2008), New York, I Love You (2009) and her collaboration with, among others, Emir Kusturica and Guillermo Arriaga on the compilation feature Words with Gods.

Other work
A longtime activist, Nair set up an annual film-makers' laboratory, Maisha Film Lab in Kampala, Uganda. Since 2005, young directors in East Africa have been trained at this non-profit facility with the belief that "If we don't tell our stories, no one else will". Maisha is currently building a school with Architect Raul Pantaleo, winner of Aga Khan Award for Architecture, and his company Studio Tamassociati.

In 1998, she used the profits from Salaam Bombay! to create the Salaam Baalak Trust which works with street children in India.

A musical adaptation of Monsoon Wedding, directed by Nair, premiered at the Berkeley Repertory Theatre, running from 5 May to 16 July 2017.

As of 2015, she lives in New York City, where she is an adjunct professor in the Film Division of the School of Arts for Columbia University. The university has a collaboration with Nair's Maisha Film Lab, and offers opportunities for international students to work together and share their interests in film-making.

In July 2020, journalist Ellen Barry announced that her Pulitzer Prize-nominated story "The Jungle Prince of Delhi" about the "royal family of Oudh", published in The New York Times, would be adapted into a web series for Amazon Studios by Nair.

In March 2021 it was announced Nair would direct a ten episode TV series for Disney+ reimagining the National Treasure series with a new cast.

Personal life
In 1977, Nair met her first husband, Mitch Epstein, when taking photography classes at Harvard University. They divorced by 1987, and in 1988 Nair met her second husband, the Indo-Ugandan political scientist Mahmood Mamdani, while in Uganda doing research for the film Mississippi Masala. Like his wife, Mamdani also teaches at Columbia University. Their son, Zohran Mamdani, was born in Uganda in 1991. In 2020, Zohran won a seat representing Astoria, Queens in the New York State Assembly after defeating incumbent Assemblymember Aravella Simotas in the Democratic primary election earlier in the year.

Nair has been an enthusiastic yoga practitioner for decades; when making a film, she has the cast and crew start the day with a yoga session.

Political views
In July 2013, Nair declined an invitation to the Haifa International Film Festival as a "guest of honor" to protest Israel's policies toward Palestine. In postings on her Twitter account, Nair stated "I will go to Israel when the walls come down. I will go to Israel when occupation is gone...I will go to Israel when the state does not privilege one religion over another. I will go to Israel when Apartheid is over. I will go to Israel, soon. I stand w/ Palestine for the Academic and Cultural Boycott of Israel (PACBI) & the larger Boycott, Divestment, Sanctions (BDS) Mov’t." Nair was subsequently praised by PACBI, which stated that her decision to boycott Israel "helps to highlight the struggle against colonialism and apartheid." She subsequently tweeted "I will go to Israel, soon."

Filmography

Awards

She was awarded the India Abroad Person of the Year-2007. In 2012 she was awarded India's third highest civilian award the Padma Bhushan by President of India, Pratibha Patil.

Wins
 1985: Best Documentary Film, Global Village Film Festival: India Cabaret
 1986: Golden Athena, Athens International Film Festival: India Cabaret
 1986: Blue Ribbon, American Film Festival: India Cabaret
 1988: Audience Award, Cannes Film Festival: Salaam Bombay!
 1988: Golden Camera (Best First Film), Cannes Film Festival: Salaam Bombay!
 1988: National Film Award for Best Feature Film in Hindi: Salaam Bombay!
 1988: National Board of Review Award for Top Foreign Films: Salaam Bombay!
 1988: "Jury Prize", "Most Popular Film" and "Prize of the Ecumenical Jury" at Montreal World Film Festival: Salaam Bombay!
 1988: New Generation Award, Los Angeles Film Critics Association Awards
 1988: Lilian Gish Award (Excellence in Feature Film), Los Angeles Women in Film Festival: Salaam Bombay!
 1991: Golden Osella (Best Original Screenplay), Venice Film Festival: Mississippi Masala (with Sooni Taraporevala)
 1991: Critics Special Award, São Paulo International Film Festival: Mississippi Masala
 1992: Best Director (Foreign Film), Italian National Syndicate of Film Journalists: Mississippi Masala
 1992: Asian Media Award, Asian American International Film Festival
 1993: Independent Spirit Award for Best Feature: Mississippi Masala
 2000: Special Mention (Documentary and Essay), Biarritz International Festival of Audiovisual Programming: The Laughing Club of India
 2001: Golden Lion (Best Film), Venice Film Festival: Monsoon Wedding
 2001: Laterna Magica Prize, Venice Film Festival: Monsoon Wedding
 2002: Audience Award, Canberra International Film Festival: Monsoon Wedding
 2002: Special Award for International Cinema, Zee Cine Awards: Monsoon Wedding
 2002: UNESCO Award, Venice Film Festival: 11'9"01 September 11
 2003: Faith Hubley Memorial Award, Provincetown International Film Festival
2003: Harvard Arts Medal
 2004: Faith Hubley Web of Life Award, Rochester-High Falls International Film Festival
 2007: "Golden Aphrodite", Love Is Folly International Film Festival (Bulgaria): The Namesake
 2012: "IFFI Centenary Award" for The Reluctant Fundamentalist
 2012: Padma Bhushan by Government of India

Nominations
 1989: Academy Award for Best Foreign Language Film: Salaam Bombay!
 1989: César Award for Best Foreign Film (Meilleur film étranger): Salaam Bombay!
 1989: Golden Globe Award for Best Foreign Language Film: Salaam Bombay!
 1990: BAFTA Award for Best Film Not in the English Language: Salaam Bombay!
 1990: Filmfare Best Director Award: Salaam Bombay!
 1990: Filmfare Best Movie Award: Salaam Bombay!
 1991: Golden Lion (Best Film), Venice Film Festival: Mississippi Masala
 1996: Golden Seashell, San Sebastián International Film Festival: Kama Sutra: A Tale of Love
 1999: Best Film, Verzaubert International Gay & Lesbian Film Festival: My Own Country
 2001: Screen International Award (Best Non-European Film), European Film Awards: Monsoon Wedding
 2001: Golden Globe Award for Best Foreign Language Film: Monsoon Wedding
 2002: BAFTA Award for Best Film Not in the English Language: Monsoon Wedding
 2003: Golden Star, International Film Festival of Marrakech: Hysterical Blindness
 2003: César Award for Best Film from the European Union: 11'9"01 September 11
 2004: Golden Lion (Best Film), Venice Film Festival: Vanity Fair
 2007: Gotham Award for Best Film: The Namesake

See also 
 Indians in the New York City metropolitan area

References

Further reading
Jigna Desai: Beyond Bollywood: The cultural politics of South Asian diasporic film. New York: Routledge, 2004, 280 pp. ill.  (inb.) /  (hft.)
Gita Rajan: Pliant and compliant: colonial Indian art and postcolonial cinema. Women. Oxford (Print), ISSN 0957-4042 ; 13(2002):1, pp. 48–69.
Alpana Sharma: Body matters: the politics of provocation in Mira Nair's films. QRFV : Quarterly review of film and video, ISSN 1050-9208 ; 18(2001):1, pp. 91–103.
Pratibha Parmar: Mira Nair: filmmaking in the streets of Bombay. Spare rib, ISSN 0306-7971; 198, 1989, pp. 28–29.
Gwendolyn Audrey Foster: Women Filmmakers of the African and Asian Diaspora: Decolonizing the Gaze, Locating Subjectivity. Carbondale, Ill. : Southern Illinois University Press, 1997. 
 John Kenneth Muir: Mercy in Her Eyes: The Films of Mira Nair. Hal Leonard, 2006. , .

External links

 Mira Nair Bibliography (via UC Media Resources Center Berkeley)
 SAWNET biography
 Biography
 
 Maisha Film Lab in Kampala, Uganda
 Video Interview on LX.TV
 A Conversation with Mira Nair - Harvard @ Home program
 Profile of Mira Nair - on MirabaiFilms.com
 Video interview with The Namesake director on Sidewalks Entertainment
 Video: Mira Nair at the Asia Society, 10 Dec 2009
 Mira Nair: A Life in Pictures, BAFTA event video
The Fabulous Picture Show (part 1, part 2) - Master Class with Mira Nair at the Doha film festival, Al Jazeera English, Dec 2009
 

1957 births
People from Rourkela
Activists from Odisha
Artists from Bhubaneswar
Living people

Film directors from New York City
20th-century Indian film directors
21st-century Indian film directors
English-language film directors

Directors of Caméra d'Or winners
Directors of Golden Lion winners
Golden Globe Award winners
Recipients of the Padma Bhushan in arts

Columbia University faculty
Harvard University alumni
Delhi University alumni

American women film directors
Indian women film directors
Indian women activists
Women artists from Odisha
20th-century Indian women artists
21st-century Indian women artists

Indian emigrants to the United States
American film directors of Indian descent
American people of Punjabi descent
American women academics
21st-century American women
Indian directors